Corps of Military Police (CMP) is the military police of the Indian Army. In addition, the CMP is trained to handle prisoners of war and to regulate traffic, as well as to handle basic telecommunication equipment such as telephone exchanges. They can be identified by their red berets, white lanyards and belts, and they also wear a black brassard with the letters MP imprinted in red.

The term 'red berets' is synonymous with the personnel of the elite corps of Military Police (CMP), since all ranks of this Corps adorn the exclusive red berets along with white belts to distinguish themselves from other Corps of Army. The role of this Corps is primarily to assist Army formations in maintaining a high standard of discipline of its troops, prevent breaches of various rules and regulations and to assist in the preservation of high morale of all ranks of the formation.

History

The First section of Indian Corps of Military Police was raised in July 1939, with the name of Force 4 Provost unit and initially was part of the 4th Indian Infantry Division which was the first Indian Formation to be inducted in World War 2. The Provost section was raised by taking soldiers from the 7 and 11 Cavalry Regiment. The recorded date of raising the first Provost Unit is 28 August 1939 and the Unit served in campaigns of North Africa and Burma during the World War 2 and after the successful operations by this newly formed unit during these campaigns, the British Government of India formally sanctioned the formation of Corps of Indian Military Police on 7 July 1942.

Initially under the British rule, the Corps was known as 'Corps of Indian Military Police (CIMP)' and after the Freedom of India on 18 October 1947, the corps was re-designated and now is known as 'Corps of Military Police (CMP)',which is now celebrated as Corps Raising Day.

Role and Task of Corps of Military Police
 Policing the Cantonments and Army Establishments
 Maintenance of Order and Discipline in the cantonments, Army Establishments and to prevent the breach of Rules and Regulations of the Indian Army by the Soldiers serving in the Regular Army.
 Maintaining the movements of Logistics, soldiers and vehicles in the cantonments during peace and war both times
 Handling POWs
 Controlling stragglers and refugees in war
 Assistance to other regiments, soldiers and their families
 Aid to Civil Police and is responsible to make liaison with Civil Police, Naval police, and Air Force police
 Investigating Cases of the Indian Army
 Providing pilot vehicles to Division Commanders, Corps Commanders, Army Commanders and COAS
 Providing close protection to the Chief of Army Staff

Band

The CMP Brass Band is the military police's official military band. It was raised in 1953 in Faizabad. In 1966, the band was assigned to privileged duties at the Rashtrapati Bhavan. It received official commendation by the President of India A. P. J. Abdul Kalam in 2003. It was nominated by the army to take part in the tri-services band concert in 1994 at Pune. This band has performed at Amar Jawan Jyoti during 1977, 1988 and 1993. It has participated in army and the Delhi Republic Day parades regularly. It also has the distinction of forming part of the largest military band under one conductor creating a Guinness world record on 16 December 1997 in New Delhi.

UN Missions
Soldiers of the Corps served in Different UN Mission contingents at Congo, Somalia, Rwanda and Sierra Leone, and are presently deployed in UNFIL, Lebanon and UNDOF and Golan Heights.

References

External links
 Official website of the Indian Army

Administrative corps of the Indian Army
Federal law enforcement agencies of India
India